Tom Clark Conley (born 1943) is an American philologist. He is Lowell Professor in the Departments of Romance Languages and Visual and Environmental Studies at Harvard University where he studies relations of space and writing in literature, cartography, and cinema. He and his wife Verena are Faculty Deans of Kirkland House.

Biography
 
He obtained a B.A. at Lawrence University (1965), an M.A. in French at Columbia University (1966), and a Ph.D. at the University of Wisconsin (1971).

His work moves to and from early modern France and issues in theory and interpretation in visual media.  Books include Film Hieroglyphs (1991, 2nd edition 2006), The Graphic Unconscious in Early Modern Writing (1992), The Self-Made Map: Cartographic Writing in Early Modern France (1996, 2nd edition 2010), L’Inconscient graphique: Essai sur la lettre à la Renaissance (2000), Cartographic Cinema (2007), and An Errant Eye: Topography and Poetry in Early Modern France (2010). He has published Su realismo (Valencia, 1988), a critical study of Las Hurdes (Luis Buñuel, 1932).

His translations include Michel de Certeau, The Writing of History (1988 and 1992), and the same author's Capture of Speech (1997) and Culture in the Plural (1997); Jean-Louis Schefer, Paolo Uccello, The Deluge, the Plague (1995); Réda Bensmaia, The Year of Passages (1992); Marc Augé, In the Metro (2003) and Casablanca: Movies and Memory (2009); Gilles Deleuze, The Fold: Leibniz and the Baroque (1993); Christian Jacob, The Sovereign Map (2006).

Among his 250 articles and book-chapters are contributions, in films studies, to The History of Cartography 3: The European Renaissance, Cinema and Modernity, Michael Haneke, The Epic Film, Film Analysis, Opening André Bazin, Burning Darkness:  A Half-Century of Spanish Cinema, Film, Theory and Philosophy, European Film Theory.  Essays on early modern literature have appeared in A New History of French Literature, The Cambridge Companion to Montaigne, The History of Cartography 3: The European Renaissance, La Satire dans tous ses états, French Global, and other books of essays.

Before locating at Harvard University Conley was Professor of French and Italian at the University of Minnesota (1971–95). He has held visiting appointments at the University of California-Berkeley (1978–79), The Graduate Center of the City University of New York (1985–87), Miami University (1992), UCLA (1995), L’École des Nationale des Chartes (2005), L’Ecole en Hautes Etudes en Sciences Sociales (2010), and other institutions. In the spring and summer of 1998, respectively, he led a Folger Library Seminar and, at Harvard University, an NEH Summer Seminar on cartography and early modern French literature. In the summers of 2001 and 2004 he taught at the Institut d’études françaises d’Avignon. In 2003 he was a seminar leader at Cornell University's School for Critical Theory.

He has been a fellow at the Institute for Research in the Humanities at the University of Wisconsin (1991), the Hermon Dunlap Smith Center for the History of Cartography (1992), Cornell University's Society for the Humanities (1998), and The Radcliffe Institute for Advanced Study (2011–12).

Past awards include a Woodrow Wilson Fellowship (1965), a Fulbright Fellowship (1968); an American Council for Learned Societies Study Fellowship (1976), summer stipends from the National Endowment for the Humanities (1972, 1988, 1992), and a Guggenheim Fellowship (2003). He has been recipient of the Palmes Académiques for pedagogy (2002) and a Medal of Honor of the City of Tours.  In 2011 the Université Blaise-Pascal (Clermont-Ferrand) awarded him an honorary doctorate.

He is a member of the Modern Language Association, The International Association for the History of Cartography, the Society of Cinema and Media Studies, the Renaissance Society of America, Society for the History of Discoveries and the United States Handball Association. Since 2000 he and his spouse, Verena Conley, have been Faculty Deans of Kirkland House at Harvard University.

Awards
 Tom Conley won a Guggenheim Fellowship in 2003 for his work in topography and literature in Renaissance France.

Works
 The Graphic Unconscious in Early Modern French Writing. Cambridge; New York; Melbourne: Cambridge University Press, 1992, .
 L'inconscient graphique: essai sur l'écriture de la Renaissance (Marot, Ronsard, Rabelais, Montaigne). Saint-Denis: Presses universitaires de Vincennes, 2000, .
 Film Hieroglyphs: ruptures in classical cinema. Minneapolis: University of Minnesota Press, 2006, .
 Cartographic Cinema. Minneapolis; London: University of Minnesota Press, 2007, .

Further reading
 Bernd Renner and Phillip Usher have edited a Festschrift of 23 essays, Illustrations inconscientes: Écritures de la Renaissance. Mélanges en honneur de Tom Conley (Paris: Éditions Garnier, 2013).

References

External links

 Portrait: Tom Conley (The Crimson, March 9, 2006)
 Portrait: Tom Conley (Radcliffe Institute)

1943 births
American philologists
Harvard University faculty
Living people